Damias procrena, the procrena footman, is a moth of the family Erebidae. The species was first described by Edward Meyrick in 1886. It is found in the Australian states of Victoria and Tasmania.

References

Damias
Moths described in 1886